The Rolling Stones Museum is a museum in Portorož in Slovenia. It is dedicated to the British rock band The Rolling Stones. The music television programme VH1 proclaimed it in 2013 one of the "10 Truly Insane Music Museums + Shrines".

Background 
The origin of the collection goes back to 1964, when Slavko Franca (born 1949 ) bought his first LP of the band. It was the start of the largely extended collection of memorabilia that can be seen in the museum today. His profession as ship chief engineer, enabled him to collect items from all over the world. He started his museum at his home in Portorož, a coastal village in the Slovenian part of Istria.

Franca is a fan since the band began. Even one of his cats is called Paint It Black, after the song with the same name (1966) of the Rolling Stones. He has travelled to around fifty concerts worldwide to see shows of them. The first one was in Milan in Italy. The band, which has given more than 1,700 concerts in 40 countries, has never played in Slovenia. The 50th anniversary in London, since the first concert of the Stones there, was celebrated at the museum by three hundred guests and a concert of Chris Jagger, the younger brother of band member Mick.

The music television programme VH1 proclaimed the museum in 2013 one of the "10 Truly Insane Music Museums + Shrines."

Collection 
The museum houses a collection of around 1,000 artifacts, among which the guitar pick that band member Keith Richards once threw to Franca during a show in Belgium. Furthermore, there are oil paintings, posters, photos, records, beer glasses, T-shirts, fan articles, magazines, newspaper articles, music instruments like a guitar with signatures, and other memorabilia.

See also 
 Stones Fan Museum (Germany)
 List of music museums

References

External links
Facebook

The Rolling Stones
Music museums
Museums in Slovenia
Portorož
Music organizations based in Slovenia